Curaçao elects a legislature called the Estates of Curaçao. It consists of 21 members, elected for a four-year term by proportional representation. The first Estates of Curaçao were the succession of the Island council of Curaçao (a form of devolved government in the Netherlands Antilles), upon the dissolution of the Netherlands Antilles in 2010. In October 2012, elections were held for the Estates.

Prior to becoming a "land" within the Kingdom of the Netherlands on 10 October 2010, elections were held for the Island Council and of the Curaçao constituency of the Estates of the Netherlands Antilles.

In addition, Curaçao has held referendums in 1993, 2005 and 2009.

Latest elections

2017 elections

2016 elections

2012 Elections

2010 Elections

See also
 2012 Curaçao general election
 Electoral calendar
 Electoral system

References

 

 
Curacao